Ioana Loredana Roșca (born 20 September 1996) is a Romanian tennis player.

Roșca has won five singles titles and 25 doubles titles on the ITF Women's Circuit. On 25 January 2021, she reached her best singles ranking of world No. 363. On 8 August 2022, she peaked at No. 184 in the doubles rankings.

Junior career

Junior Grand Slam performance
Singles:
 Australian Open: 2R (2012)
 French Open: 3R (2014)
 Wimbledon: 3R (2014)
 US Open: 1R (2014)

Doubles:
 Australian Open: 1R (2012)
 French Open: W (2014)
 Wimbledon: 2R (2012, 2013)
 US Open: 2R (2014)

Career
Roșca finished school in Spain, between three and eleven years old, practicing various sports, among which also tennis. She chose to return to Romania, her native country, where she focused on tennis player career.

In June 2014, together with fellow Romanian Ioana Ducu, Roșca won the girls' doubles tournament at the French Open, defeating CiCi Bellis and Markéta Vondroušová in three sets in the final.

She was under surgery on the left knee to repair the cross and internal ligament on 12 February 2017.
In January 2018, she returned on court and reached the final at an ITF tournament in Hammamet.
In November 2021, she joined to club Sportsin Arad and received help to continue his career.

ITF Circuit finals

Singles: 13 (5 titles, 8 runner–ups)

Doubles: 46 (25 titles, 21 runner–ups)

Junior Grand Slam finals

Girls' doubles: 1 (title)

Notes

References

External links
 
 

1996 births
Living people
Sportspeople from Craiova
Romanian female tennis players
French Open junior champions
Grand Slam (tennis) champions in girls' doubles
Tennis players at the 2014 Summer Youth Olympics